Albert Ziegler (born 4 July 1961 in Siebeldingen) is a German psychologist and the Chair Professor of Educational Psychology and Research on Excellence at the Friedrich-Alexander-University Erlangen Nürnberg.

Ziegler is the Secretary-General of the International Research Association for Talent Development and Excellence (IRATDE); the Vice President of the European Council for High Ability (ECHA).; and Chairman of the European Talent Support Network (ETSN). As of August 2017, he serves as Director of the Sound Research Branch at the World Giftedness Center.  He is also the Editor-in-Chief of ECHA’s scholarly journal, High Ability Studies.  

Ziegler's work is predominantly concerned with gifted education and talent development. To date, he has published over 400 articles, chapters, and books in the field of educational psychology.

Biography 
Ziegler received a Ph.D. in psychology from Ludwig-Maximilians-University Munich.

In 2001, Ziegler followed a professorship with the Department of Educational Psychology at Johann Wolfgang von Goethe University with a position at the University of Ulm where he founded and led the Statewide Counseling and Research Center for the Gifted. By 2007, in cooperation with both the University of Ulm and the United Arab Emirates, he led an international team of experts in the development of a “national plan for the gifted.” The project was terminated prematurely due to internal difficulties.

In 2017, while at the University of Erlangen-Nürnberg, Ziegler revived the project and, together with the University of Regensburg, entered a relationship with the Hamdan Foundation for Distinguished Academic Performance concerning the development and joint establishment of a World Giftedness Center (WGC). The WGC will open its doors for the first time during the Expo 2020 in Dubai, and will commence operations in close collaboration with the United Nations Educational, Scientific, and Cultural Organization (UNESCO).

Honors and awards 
Ziegler was endowed visiting professorships at Columbia University in New York City; at the Chinese Academy of Sciences in Beijing, China; the University of Vienna in Vienna, Austria; and at the University of British Columbia in Vancouver, Canada. In 2017, he received an honorary professorship from the Pontifical Catholic University of Peru in Lima and an International Fellowship at the Chinese Academy of Sciences

Further reading 

 (1994). Die Entwicklung schlußfolgernden Denkens. Frankfurt: Peter Lang-Verlag.
 -mit Gruber, H.- (Hrsg.) (1996). Expertiseforschung: Theoretische und methodische Grundlagen. Opladen: Westdeutscher Verlag.
 -mit Ziegler, R.- (1997). Gewalt in der (Grund-)Schule: Analysen und pädagogische Konsequenzen. Aachen: Shaker.
 (2000). Der Überzeugungseffekt im logischen Denken Jugendlicher. Regensburg: Roderer.
 -mit Gruber, H. und Mack, W.- (Hrsg.) (1999). Denken und Wissen. Opladen: Deutscher Universitätsverlag.
 (Hrsg.) (2001). Implicit theories as antecedents of motivation and behavior [Special Issue]. Psychologische Beiträge, 43, 1-199.
 (2008). Hochbegabung. München: UTB.
 -mit Schober, B.- (2001). Theoretischer Hintergrund und praktische Durchführung von Reattributionstrainings. Regensburg: Roderer.
 -mit Stöger, H.- (Hrsg.) (2004). Identification of gifted students [Special Issue]. Psychology Science, 46.
 -mit Stöger, H.- (2005). Trainingshandbuch selbstreguliertes Lernen: Lernökologische Strategien für Schüler der 4. Jahrgangsstufe zur Verbesserung mathematischer Kompetenzen. Lengerich: Pabst.
 -mit Stöger, H.- (2007). Pädagogisches Kompaktwissen für Eltern von Schulkindern. Lengerich: Pabst.
 -mit Heller, K.A.- (2007). Begabt sein in Deutschland. Münster: Lit-Verlag
 -mit Stöger, H.- (2008). Trainingshandbuch selbstreguliertes Lernen II: Grundlegende Textverständnisstrategien für Schüler der 4. bis 8. Jahrgangsstufe. Lengerich: Pabst.
 -mit Stöger, H.- (Hrsg.) (2008). High Ability Assessment. Sonderausgabe von Psychology Science Quarterly, 50.
 -mit Stoeger, H.- (2009). Systemische Begabungsförderung. Sonderausgabe des Journal für Begabtenförderung, 9,(2).
 -mit Stöger, H.- (Hrsg.). (2009). Hochbegabung [Themenheft]. Heilpädagogik online, 8(2), 3-184.
 -mit Stöger, H. und Schimke, D.- (2009). Mentoring: Theoretische Hintergründe, empirische Befunde und praktische Anwendungen. Lengerich: Pabst.
 -mit Perleth, Chr.- (2011). Excellence. Münster: Lit-Verlag

References

External links
 
 Webseite der Universität Erlangen-Nürnberg über Albert Ziegler
 Webseite der Landesweiten Beratungs- und Forschungsstelle für Hochbegabung (LBFH)
 Webseite der Internationalen Begabungsforschervereinigung IRATDE

People from Südliche Weinstraße
Academic staff of the University of Erlangen-Nuremberg
Living people
1961 births
Academic staff of the University of Ulm
Educational psychologists
German psychologists